A waveguide rotary joint is used in microwave communications to connect two different types of RF waveguides.  Because coaxial parts are symmetrical in ø direction, free rotation without performance degradation is accomplished.  In the rotating part, electrical continuity is achieved by λ/4-chokes eliminating metal contacts.  The Rotary Joints can have both waveguide ports at a right angle to the rotational axis, "U-style", one waveguide port at a right angle and one in line, "L-style" or both waveguide ports in line. "I-style". Waveguide Rotary Joint modules are available for all frequency bands.

References

Radio technology